Thomas Osborne Davis (14 October 1814 – 16 September 1845) was an Irish writer; with Charles Gavan Duffy and John Blake Dillon, a founding editor of The Nation, the weekly organ of what came to be known as the Young Ireland movement. While embracing the common cause of a representative, national government for Ireland, Davis took issue with the nationalist leader Daniel O'Connell by arguing for the common ("mixed") education of Catholics and Protestants and by advocating for Irish as the national language.

Early life
Thomas Davis was born on 14 October 1814, in Mallow, County Cork, fourth and last child of James Davis, a Welsh surgeon in the Royal Artillery based for many years in Dublin, and an Irish mother. His father died in Exeter a month before his birth, en route to serve in the Peninsular War. His mother was Protestant, but also related to the Chiefs of Clan O'Sullivan of Beare, members of the Gaelic nobility of Ireland.

His mother had enough money to live on her own and moved back to Dublin in 1818, taking up residence at 67 Lower Baggot Street in 1830, where Davis lived until his death in 1845. He attended school in Lower Mount Street, then went to Trinity College, Dublin. He became auditor of the College Historical Society, and graduated in 1835 with a degree in Logic. From 1836 to 1838, he studied law in London and Europe; although he qualified as a lawyer in 1838, he never practiced.

Cultural nationalist
Davis gave a voice to the 19th-century foundational culture of modern Irish nationalism. Formerly it was based on the republicans of the 1790s and on the Catholic emancipation movement of Daniel O'Connell in the 1820s and 1830s, which had little in common with each other except for independence from Britain; Davis aimed to create a common and more inclusive base for the future.

As a Protestant, Davis preached religious unity, often building on ideas promoted by the secular United Irishmen prior to the 1798 Rebellion. He was heavily influenced by Romantic nationalism and the ideas of Johann Gottfried von Herder (1744–1803), who argued nationality was not genetic but the product of climate, geography and inclination.

In September 1842, he established The Nation newspaper with Charles Gavan Duffy and John Blake Dillon. Ostensibly designed to support O'Connell's campaign for repeal of the 1801 Union, Davis made it a vehicle for promoting the Irish language, and an Irish cultural identity separate from that of Britain. This focus can be seen in several letters written shortly before his death in 1843, that emphasise the uniqueness of the Irish countryside, and its inhabitants as a "rising, not declining, people".

His June 1840 speech as the outgoing president of the College Historical Society, contains the first explicit statement of belief in the Irish nation.
The country of our birth, our educations, our recollections, ancestral, personal, national; the country of our loves, our friendships, our hopes; our country: the cosmopolite is unnatural, base - I would fain say, impossible. To act on a world is for those above it, not of it. Patriotism is human philanthropy.

Although, unlike Davis, a native Irish speaker, O'Connell did not share this cultural nationalism. O'Connell declared "the superior utility of the English tongue, as the medium of all modern communication" too great a consideration for him to regret "the gradual abandonment " of Irish.

Differences with Daniel O'Connell
Davis supported O'Connell's Repeal Association from 1840, hoping to restore, on a reformed basis, an Irish Parliament in Dublin. There were tensions, but an open split with O'Connell first developed in 1845 on the question of non-denominational education, when the vehemence of O'Connell's opposition reduced Davis to tears.  In advance of some the Catholic bishops, O'Connell had denounced as "godless" the three new Queens Colleges in which Dublin Castle proposed to educate Catholics and Protestants together in a non-denominational basis.

When, in The Nation, Davis pleaded that "reasons for separate education are reasons for [a] separate life". O'Connell accused Davis of suggesting it a "crime to be a Catholic" and declared himself content to take a stand "for Old Ireland".  Davis, Duffy and others in the circle around The Nation he now referred to as Young Irelanders—for O'Connell an unflattering reference to Giuseppe Mazzini's anti-clerical and insurrectionist Young Italy.

A further rift with O'Connell opened over the question of a path to a possible compromise between Union and Repeal. While insisting he would "never ask for or work" for anything less than an independent legislature, O'Connell had suggested he might accept a "subordinate parliament" (an Irish legislature with powers devolved from Westminster) as "an instalment". Unlike some of his colleagues at The Nation, Davis did not reject this in principle. But while O'Connell looked for compromise at Westminster, Davis sought agreement with the "federalist" William Sharman Crawford, a representative of Protestant Ulster upon which O'Connell appeared to turn his back.

Death
Despite their differences O'Connell was distraught at Davis's early and sudden death. Davis died from scarlet fever in 1845 at the age of 30. He was buried in Mount Jerome Cemetery, Dublin.

Legacy

Davis composed a number of songs, including Irish rebel songs, such as "The West's Asleep", "A Nation Once Again", "In Bodenstown Churchyard", and the "Lament for Owen Roe O'Neill". As well as many contributions to periodicals and newspapers, he wrote a memoir of Curran, the Irish lawyer and orator, prefixed to an edition of his speeches, and a history of the 1689 Patriot Parliament; other literary plans were left unfinished by his early death.

A statue of Davis, created by Edward Delaney, was unveiled on College Green, Dublin, in 1966, attended by the Irish president, Éamon de Valera.

The main street of his home town of Mallow is named Davis Street, which contains a bronze statue of Davis designed by sculptor Leo Higgins. One of the secondary schools in Mallow, Davis College, is named after him.

A number of Gaelic Athletic Association clubs around the country are also named after him, including one in Tallaght, Dublin and one in Corrinshego, County Armagh.

Fort Davis, at the entrance to Cork Harbour, is named after him.

Thomas Davis Street, off Francis Street in Dublin 8, is also named after him.

Bibliography
The Patriot Parliament of 1689: first edition (1843); third edition, with an introduction by Charles Gavan Duffy (1893)
The Life of the Right Hon. J. P. Curran (1846)
Letters of a Protestant, on Repeal [Five letters originally published in The Nation.] Edited by Thomas F. Meagher (1847)
Literary and Historical Essays (edited by Charles Gavan Duffy) (1846)
The Poems of Thomas Davis (with notes and historical illustrations edited by Thomas Wallis) (1846)

References

Sources

External links

1814 births
1845 deaths
19th-century deaths from tuberculosis
19th-century Irish poets
19th-century Irish businesspeople
Alumni of King's Inns
Alumni of Trinity College Dublin
Auditors of the College Historical Society
Thomas Osborne Davis
Irish Anglicans
Irish male poets
Irish newspaper founders
Irish people of Welsh descent
People from County Cork
Protestant Irish nationalists
Tuberculosis deaths in Ireland
Young Irelanders